Helge Frederik Lindh (born 6 December 1976) is a German politician of the Social Democratic Party (SPD) who has been serving as a member of the Bundestag since 2017, representing the Wuppertal I district.

Political career 
Lindh became a member of the Bundestag in the 2017 German federal election. In parliament, he is a member of the Committee for Cultural Affairs and Media and the Committee for Internal Affairs. He serves as his parliamentary group’s rapporteur on antisemitism.

Since the 2021 elections, Lindh has been serving as his parliamentary group’s spokesperson for cultural affairs and media.

Within the SPD parliamentary group, Lindh belongs to the Parliamentary Left, a left-wing movement.

Other activities 
 German Federal Cultural Foundation, Member of the Board of Trustees (since 2022)
 German Federal Film Board (FFA), Member of the Supervisory Board (since 2022)
 Memorial to the Murdered Jews of Europe Foundation, Member of the Board of Trustees (since 2022) 
 Haus der Geschichte, Alternate Member of the Board of Trustees (since 2022)
 German Historical Museum (DHM), Member of the Board of Trustees
 Federal Agency for Civic Education (BPB), Alternate Member of the Board of Trustees (since 2018)
 Bündnis für Demokratie und Toleranz, Member of the Advisory Board

References

External links 

  
 Bundestag biography 

1976 births
Living people
Members of the Bundestag for North Rhine-Westphalia
Members of the Bundestag 2017–2021
Members of the Bundestag 2021–2025
Members of the Bundestag for the Social Democratic Party of Germany